Asia Downunder was a television magazine programme, formerly known as Asia Dynamic, reporting on activities of Asians in New Zealand and New Zealand Asians abroad which ran from 1994 to 2011. Its target audience was the Asian population in New Zealand, and the programme is funded by New Zealand On Air. Content of the show ranged from diverse subjects such as art, science, to sports and pan Asian culture.

Content
According to Melissa Lee, the programme was "about why Asian people do what [they] do, when, where, how and with whom. It isn't just a television programme but a bridge connecting our diverse communities - to promote better understanding." Lee is a former Asia Downunder producer and presenter who is now a list MP for the National Party. For the last four seasons, the show was produced by Chris Wright and presented by Kadambari Gladding  formerly Kadambari Raghukumar.

Schedule
The programme was produced by Television New Zealand since 1994 and a new episode screened each Sunday morning at 11:00am on their TV ONE.

In April 2011, TVNZ and NZ On Air decided not to renew the programme for a 19th season.

Despite being cancelled, full episodes are still available on the TVNZ OnDemand website and YouTube.

References

External links
 Asia Downunder - YouTube channel
 Asia Downunder-TVNZ site

1990s New Zealand television series
2000s New Zealand television series
2010s New Zealand television series
1994 New Zealand television series debuts
2011 New Zealand television series endings
New Zealand television news shows
Television shows funded by NZ on Air
TVNZ 1 original programming